The 2005 season was the St. Louis Rams' 68th in the National Football League and their 11th in St. Louis. They tried to improve on their previous output in which they won eight games. Instead, they collapsed and finished the season with a 6–10 record. From 2006 onwards the Rams continued to crumble: during the subsequent nine seasons in St. Louis, the team neither made it into the playoffs nor finished with a winning record (though they almost made it into the 2010 playoffs, but lost to the Seahawks in their last game to lose the division). Their 6–42 record between 2007 and 2009 was the worst for such a period by any team between the World War II Chicago Cardinals and the 2015 to 2017 Cleveland Browns.

On October 10, news broke out that head coach Mike Martz announced he was leaving the team indefinitely after being diagnosed with a bacterial infection. A day before that, he coached his last game in a home loss against Seattle. Joe Vitt took over the sidelines for the rest of the season. Though Martz was medically cleared to return, management refused to let him do so and he was fired the day after the final regular season game. Several players said they enjoyed having Martz as their head coach.

As second-year running back Steven Jackson earned the starting position, this year was the final season for future Hall of Famer Marshall Faulk as he missed the following season because of reconstructive knee surgery, which ultimately led to his retirement in 2007.

Roster

Schedule

Note: Intra-division opponents are in bold text.

Season summary

Week 2: at Arizona Cardinals

Standings

References

St. Louis Rams
St. Louis Rams seasons
St Louis